Oren Arnold (July 20, 1900 - August 30, 1980) was an American journalist and novelist. He worked for the Houston Chronicle, the El Paso Times, and The Arizona Republic. He authored 80 novels about the Old West, mostly while he was living in Phoenix, Arizona from 1933 to 1970. He was a student of Rice University where he was  editor of the student newspaper, the "Thresher" and president of "writers club".

References

1900 births
1980 deaths
American male journalists
American male novelists
People from Laguna Beach, California
People from Rusk County, Texas
Rice University alumni
Writers from Phoenix, Arizona
20th-century American journalists
20th-century American novelists
20th-century American male writers